Purpuraturris cryptorrhaphe is a species of sea snail, a marine gastropod mollusk in the family Turridae, the turrids.

Description
The length of the shell 70 mm, its maximum diameter 18 mm.

The shell has a yellowish brown to chestnut-color. It contains two strong sharp keels, and smaller revolving lines. The aperture is frequently tinged with purple.

Distribution
This marine species occurs off Indonesia and Philippines to Papua New Guinea and east to Marshall islands and Fiji; Queensland, Australia.

References

 Adams, H. & Adams, A. 1853. The genera of Recent Mollusca arranged according to their organization. London : John Van Voorst Vol. 1(Parts I-VIII) pp. 1-256, pls 1-32.
 Schepman, M.M. 1913. The Prosobranchia of the Siboga Expedition. Part 5. Toxoglossa. Resultats Siboga-Expeditie 49(1): 365-452, pls 25-30
 Powell, A.W.B. 1964. The Family Turridae in the Indo-Pacific. Part 1. The Subfamily Turrinae. Indo-Pacific Mollusca 1: 227-346
 Shikama, T. 1964. Selected shells of the world illustrated in colours. Tokyo : Hokuryu-Kan Vol. 2 pp. 1-212.
 Kilburn, R.N., Fedosov, A.E., Olivera, B.M. 2012. Revision of the genus Turris Batsch, 1789 (Gastropoda:Conoidea: Turridae) with the description of six new species. Zootaxa 3244: 1-58

External links
 Sowerby I, G. B. (1825). A catalogue of the shells contained in the collection of the late Earl of Tankerville: arranged according to the Lamarckian conchological system: together with an appendix, containing descriptions of many new species- London, vii + 92 + xxxiv pp
 Wood, W. (1828). Supplement to the Index Testaceologicus; or A catalogue of Shells, British and Foreign. Richard Taylor, London. Iv (+1) + 59 pp., plates 1-8
  Kiener L.C. 1839-1842. Spécies général et iconographie des coquilles vivantes. Vol. 5. Famille des Canalifères. Première partie. Genres Cérite (Cerithium), Adanson, pp. 1-104, pl. 1-32
 Chase, K., Watkins, M., Safavi-Hemami, H. & Olivera, B. M. (2022). Integrating venom peptide libraries into a phylogenetic and broader biological framework. Frontiers in Molecular Biosciences. 9: 784419
  Tucker, J.K. 2004 Catalog of recent and fossil turrids (Mollusca: Gastropoda). Zootaxa 682:1-1295.

cryptorraphe
Gastropods described in 1825